La Chica de Ayer (English: The Girl from Yesterday) is a Spanish television series which first aired on the channel Antena 3 between 26 April and 14 June 2009. A detective show, it is based on the British series Life on Mars which features a policeman suddenly transported back to 1973. The Spanish version of the show is set four years later, in 1977, and takes its name from the Spanish song "La Chica de Ayer" by Nacha Pop in a similar manner to the British version which was named after the David Bowie song "Life on Mars?". It features Ernesto Alterio in the role of Samuel Santos, a modern-day police officer who finds himself in 1977 post-Franco Spain under the command of Quin Gallardo (Antonio Garrido), a tough old-school policeman contemptuous of his modern methods.

The show was not renewed for a second season. The producers made two versions of the season finale and aired the one written to wrap up the series if it did not continue.

Episode list 
 "Regreso al pasado" ("Back to the past")
 "La mujer del vestido rojo" ("The woman in the red dress")
 "Llega el inspector Quintana" ("Inspector Quintana arrives")
 "El padre de Samuel, en peligro" ("The father of Samuel, in danger")
 "Vicente, el travestido" ("Vincent, the transvestite")
 "El caso de las feministas" ("The case of the feminists")
 "El abandono" ("Abandonment")
 "La luz al final del túnel" ("The light at the end of the tunnel")

References 

2000s Spanish drama television series
Spanish time travel television series
2009 Spanish television series debuts
2009 Spanish television series endings
Spanish television series based on British television series
Life on Mars (franchise)
Television series set in 1977
2000s police procedural films